Mesityl oxide is a α,β-unsaturated ketone with the formula CH3C(O)CH=C(CH3)2. This compound is a colorless, volatile liquid with a honey-like odor.

Synthesis
It is prepared by the aldol condensation of acetone to give diacetone alcohol, which readily dehydrates to give this compound.

Phorone and isophorone may be formed under the same conditions. Isophorone originates via a Michael addition:

Phorone is formed by continued aldol condensation:

Uses
Mesityl oxide is used as a solvent and in the production of methyl isobutyl ketone by hydrogenation:

Further hydrogenation gives 4-methyl-2-pentanol (methyl isobutyl carbinol).

Dimedone is another established use of mesityl oxide.

References

External links
IPCS INCHEM Description
CDC - NIOSH Pocket Guide to Chemical Hazards

Enones
Ketone solvents